This is a list of cities and towns in the Republic of the Congo with population of 5,000 or more, according to 2007 census.

List

External links
 at World-Gazetteer.com

 
Congo, List of cities in the Republic of the
Congo, Republic
Cities